Aston Fields is a village in the district of Bromsgrove, Worcestershire, United Kingdom. It is situated to the south of Bromsgrove and is the site of Bromsgrove railway station. It was the location of Bromsgrove railway works, established in 1841, which was a maintenance facility for the Birmingham and Gloucester Railway. The works closed in 1964.

References

External links

 St Godwalds Church
 

Villages in Worcestershire